Velay Football Club is a football club based in the towns of Blanzac, Polignac, and Saint-Paulien in the Haute-Loire department of France. As of the 2022–23 season, it competes in the sixth tier of the French football league system.

History 
In 2016, AS Polignac merged with Saint-Paulien Blanzac FC to create Velay FC. In 2020, the club achieved promotion to the Championnat National 3 for the first time in its history.

References 

Sport in Haute-Loire
Association football clubs established in 2016
2016 establishments in France
Football clubs in Auvergne-Rhône-Alpes